In mathematics, Lefschetz duality is a version of Poincaré duality in geometric topology, applying to a manifold with boundary. There are now numerous formulations of Lefschetz duality or Poincaré–Lefschetz duality, or Alexander–Lefschetz duality.

Formulations
Let M be an orientable compact manifold of dimension n, with boundary , and let  be the fundamental class of the manifold M. Then cap product with z (or its dual class in cohomology) induces a pairing of the (co)homology groups of M and the relative (co)homology of the pair .

Here  can in fact be empty, so Poincaré duality appears as a special case of Lefschetz duality.

There is a version for triples.  Let  decompose into subspaces A and B, themselves compact orientable manifolds with common boundary Z, which is the intersection of A and B. Then, for each , there is an isomorphism

Notes

References

Duality theories
Manifolds